The following lists events that happened during 1923 in Southern Rhodesia.

Incumbents
 Prime Minister: Charles Coghlan

Events
 Abraham Twala forms the Rhodesian Bantu Voters' Association

September
 21 September - The British South Africa Company's rule is terminated. Southern Rhodesia becomes a full self-governing colony, effective from the 1 October.

Births

Deaths

References 

 
Years of the 20th century in Southern Rhodesia
Zimbabwe
Zimbabwe, 1923 In